Teracotona quadripunctata is a moth of the family Erebidae first described by Wichgraf in 1908. It is found in Togo, Ghana and Nigeria.

References

Moths described in 1908
Spilosomina
Insects of West Africa
Moths of Africa